Events from the year 1997 in Pakistan.

Incumbents

Federal government
President: Farooq Leghari (until 2 December), Wasim Sajjad (acting) (starting 2 December)
Prime Minister: Malik Meraj Khalid (until 17 February), Nawaz Sharif (starting 17 February)
Chief Justice: Sajjad Ali Shah (until 2 December), Ajmal Mian

Governors
Governor of Balochistan – Imran Ullah Khan (until 22 April); Miangul Aurangzeb (starting 22 April)
Governor of Khyber Pakhtunkhwa – Arif Bangash
Governor of Punjab – Khawaja Tariq Rahim (until 11 March); Shahid Hamid (starting 11 March)
Governor of Sindh – Kamaluddin Azfar (until 17 March); Moinuddin Haider (starting 17 March)

Events

March
 3 February – General elections are held.

August
 14 August – Pakistan celebrates 50 years of independence from British rule.

November
13 November – Nawaz Sharif promises US president Bill Clinton he will find those responsible for the killing of four US businessmen and their Pakistani driver.
26 November – Pakistan's first motorway linking Islamabad to Lahore is opened.

December
 2 December – Pakistan's president, Farooq Leghari, resigns. Wasim Sajjad becomes interim president for the second time.

Births
 20 May – Shazia Masih, torture victim (died 2010)
 12 July – Malala Yousafzai, activist for female education

Deaths
 16 August – Nusrat Fateh Ali Khan, Pakistani Qawwali artist (b. 1948)

See also
1996 in Pakistan
Other events of 1997
1998 in Pakistan
Timeline of Pakistani history

References

 
Pakistan